

The Coca-Cola Bottling Plant (also known as the Florida Coca-Cola Bottling Company) is an historic building located at 939 North Magnolia Avenue in Ocala, Florida, United States. Built in 1939, it was designed by Fort Lauderdale architect Courtney Stewart in the Mission/Spanish Revival style of architecture.  On May 4, 1979, it was added to the U.S. National Register of Historic Places. Now owned and operated by Gartner Group, Inc. The building is the site of Grand Pointe Ocala, the cities premier event and conference center.

Gallery

See also
 Coca-Cola Bottling Plant (Fort Lauderdale, Florida)
 Coca-Cola Bottling Company Building (Columbia, Missouri)
 Elmira Coca-Cola Bottling Company Works

References

External links
 Marion County listings at National Register of Historic Places
 Marion County listings at Florida's Office of Cultural and Historical Programs

Coca-Cola buildings and structures
Buildings and structures in Ocala, Florida
National Register of Historic Places in Marion County, Florida
Manufacturing plants in the United States
Courtney Stewart buildings